Cnephia is a genus of 9 species of black flies. They are distributed in scattered locations across the Northern Hemisphere, from Ukraine to Eastern Siberia, and some parts of North America.

Species
C. angarensis Rubtsov, 1956
C. chaurensis Yankovsky, 2000
C. dacotensis (Dyar & Shannon, 1927)
C. eremites Shewell, 1952
C. intermedia Rubtsov, 1956
C. ornithophilia Davies, Peterson & Wood, 1962
C. pallipes (Fries, 1824)
C. pecuarum (Riley, 1887)
C. toptchievi Yankovsky, 1996

Literature cited

Simuliidae
Chironomoidea genera